Morristown, New Jersey is a town in Morris County.

Morristown, New Jersey may also refer to:

Morristown, Middlesex County, New Jersey

See also
Mauricetown, New Jersey in Cumberland County
Moorestown, New Jersey in Burlington County
Morris Plains, New Jersey in Morris County
Morris Township, New Jersey in Morris County